New Zealand at the 1964 Summer Olympics was represented by a team of 64 competitors, 56 men and eight women, who took part in 35 events across 11 sports. Selection of the team for the Games in Tokyo, Japan, was the responsibility of the New Zealand Olympic and British Empire Games Association. New Zealand's flagbearer at the opening ceremony was Peter Snell. The New Zealand team finished equal 12th on the medal table, winning a total of five medals, three of which were gold.

Medal tables

Athletics

Track and road

Field

Boxing

Cycling

Five cyclists represented New Zealand in 1964.

Road
Men's individual road race

Men's team time trial

Equestrian

Jumping

Gymnastics

Women's individual
Apparatus qualifying and all-around

None of the New Zealand gymnasts qualified for any of the apparatus finals.

Field hockey

Men's tournament
Team roster

Group A

Rowing

In 1964, New Zealand entered boats in three of the seven events: men's single sculls, men's coxed four, and men's eight. The competition was for men only; women would first row at the 1976 Summer Olympics.

Sailing

Swimming

Weightlifting

Wrestling

Officials
 Team manager – William Stevenson
 Assistant team manager – Ron Shakespeare
 Team doctor – Renton Grigor
 Chaperone – Zelda Bridgens
 Athletics section manager – Max Carr
 Boxing section manager – Syd Ashton
 Cycling section manager – Bob Carruthers
 Equestrian section manager – Ben Rutherford
 Field hockey section manager – Bob Milne
 Gymnastics section manager – David McKenzie-Edwards
 Rowing
 Section manager – Jack Stevenson
 Coach (eight and four) – Eric Craies
 Sailing section manager – Don St Clair Brown
 Swimming section manager – Bryan Simpson
 Weightlifting section manager – Trevor Clark

References

Nations at the 1964 Summer Olympics
1964
Summer Olympics